is a Japanese manga artist best known for his manga Genshiken, which was originally serialized in the Afternoon Magazine. It was later published in Japan by Kodansha, which produces Afternoon Magazine, and by Del Rey in the United States. Genshiken is an anime, manga, and light novel series about a college otaku club and its members.

Works
 (1994) - won Afternoon's Four Seasons Award for debut works
 (1995)
 (1997)
 (1998) - sequel of Yonensei
 (April 2002 - May 2006)
 (2004, 2006 (anime), 2006-2007 (manga)) (original creator)
 (2008)
Spotted Flower (2009 - )
 (October 2010 - August 2016) - sequel to Genshiken
Hashikko Ensemble (2018 - 2022)

External links

1974 births
Living people
Manga artists
University of Tsukuba alumni